Time in Sudan is given by a single time zone, officially denoted as Central Africa Time (CAT; UTC+02:00). Sudan has observed CAT since 1 November 2017. Sudan has not observed daylight saving time since 14 October 1985.

History 
Sudan observed the UTC offset of 2:10:08 as its local mean time until 1931, when it adopted UTC+02:00 as standard time. On 15 January 2000, Sudan's time moved forward one hour to UTC+03:00; this change was later reverted on 1 November 2017 when Sudan readopted UTC+02:00.

Daylight saving time 
Sudan previously observed daylight saving time between 1970 and 1985, moving the clock forward one hour from UTC+02:00 to UTC+03:00.

IANA time zone database 
In the IANA time zone database, Sudan is given one zone in the file zone.tab – Africa/Khartoum. "SD" refers to the country's ISO 3166-1 alpha-2 country code. Data for Sudan directly from zone.tab of the IANA time zone database; columns marked with * are the columns from zone.tab itself:

See also 
Time in South Sudan
Daylight saving time in Africa
List of time zones by country
List of UTC time offsets

References

External links 
Current time in Sudan at Time.is
Time in Sudan at TimeAndDate.com

Time in Sudan